Michael Wiseman (born April 12, 1967) is an American television and film actor. He is best known for his portrayal of Johnny Rizzo in the 2012 CBS series Vegas.

Early life and career
Wiseman grew up in Lafayette, California. He knew as a boy that he wanted to be an actor; the caption of his eighth grade yearbook picture said, "Career Goal: football player or famous actor". He graduated from Saint Mary's College High School in Berkeley, California, in 1985.

Wiseman spent two decades working in Hollywood before landing the part of Rizzo, during which he played an outspoken student in the PBS series French in Action, performed supporting roles in Tim Burton's remake of Planet of the Apes and Surviving Gilligan's Island.  He has acted in over 65 television series, including Cheers, ER, Melrose Place, NYPD Blue, NCIS and The X-Files.

Personal life
Wiseman is married to Caroline Keenan-Wiseman, an Emmy-nominated hairstylist and makeup artist. The couple have two daughters. In 2011, Wiseman and his family moved back to his childhood city of Lafayette, California.

Selected filmography
 1990 Caged Fury as Policeman #2
 1990 Predator 2 as Cop #2
 1993 Judgment Night as Travis
 1994 The Stöned Age as Crump's Brother
 1995 Black Scorpion as 'Hacksaw'
 1995 Excessive Force II: Force on Force as Bobby Tucci
 1995 Huntress: Spirit of the Night as Jacob
 1996 The War at Home as Lieutenant
 1996 Crossworlds as Cop #2
 1998 NYPD Blue as Tommy Richardson
 2001 Planet of the Apes as Specialist Hansen
 2001 The X-Files as Dr. Rocky Bronzino (episode 'Lord of the Flies')
 2004 Rancid as Detective Kent
 2006 The Wicker Man as Officer Pete
 2006 Hiding Victoria as Lenny
 2007 Chuck as Lon Kirk
 2014 Atlas Shrugged Part III: Who Is John Galt? as The Bartender
 2016 Retreat! as Lieutenant Fuller
 2017 Running Wild as Doug Ciocca
 2017 Pray for Rain as Ron Skinner
 2017 In Search of Fellini as Clive Montgomery

References

External links
 

Date of birth missing (living people)
Year of birth uncertain
Living people
20th-century American male actors
21st-century American male actors
Male actors from California
American male television actors
American male film actors
People from Lafayette, California
1967 births